Cerro Huachamacari, also spelled Huachamakari or Kushamakari, is a tepui in Amazonas state, Venezuela.

It is within Duida-Marahuaca National Park.

See also
 Distribution of Heliamphora

References

Further reading

 Jaffe, K., J. Lattke & R. Perez-Hernández (January–June 1993). Ants on the tepuies of the Guiana Shield: a zoogeographic study. Ecotropicos 6(1): 21–28.

Tepuis of Venezuela
Mountains of Venezuela
Geography of Amazonas (Venezuelan state)